The Big East men's basketball tournament is the championship tournament of the Big East Conference in men's basketball. The winner receives the conference's automatic bid to the NCAA Men's Division I Basketball Championship.

As part of the 2013 deal in which seven schools left the original Big East Conference of 1979–2013 to form a new Big East Conference and the original conference became the American Athletic Conference, the new Big East retained the rights to the conference tournament.

Venue
Since 1983, the tournament has been held in Madison Square Garden, New York City.  As such, the tournament is the longest-running conference tournament at any one site in all of college basketball. Madison Square Garden has a contract with the Big East Conference to host the tournament through 2028.

Notable events

The 2009 tournament featured a six-overtime game in the quarterfinals between the Connecticut Huskies and the Syracuse Orange, in which Syracuse prevailed, 127–117. The game, the second-longest in NCAA history, started on the evening of March 12 and ended nearly four hours later in the early morning of March 13.

In 2011, Connecticut, led by Kemba Walker, became the first and only team in the Big East tournament ever to win five games in five consecutive days to win the championship.

On March 12, 2020, the 2020 tournament was cancelled during halftime of a first round game due to the COVID-19 pandemic. The conference received an insurance payout of $10.5 million as a result of the tournament's cancellation.

In 2021, Georgetown won four games in four days as an underdog in each contest, to win its record eighth title. Patrick Ewing became the first person to win the championship as both a player and a head coach. 

Only three players have achieved repeat Most Valuable Player honors: Georgetown's Patrick Ewing (1984–1985), Louisville's Peyton Siva (2012–2013), and Villanova's Josh Hart (2015, 2017).

Seeding
From 1980 through 2000, all Big East member schools qualified for the Big East tournament. The Big East limited participation to 12 schools from 2001 to 2008, but since 2009, all member schools again have qualified for the tournament. The conference has based tournament seeding strictly on conference record and tiebreakers except between 1996 and 1998 and between 2001 and 2003; during those years, the conference used a divisional structure which also affected seeding.

1980–1995
In 1980, with seven member schools, the #2 through #7 seeds played in an opening quarterfinal round and the #1 seed received a bye until the semifinal round. In 1981, the conference expanded to eight teams, and in 1981 and 1982, all eight teams began play in a  quarterfinal round. After the conference expanded again, to nine teams, the #8 and #9 seeds played in a single first-round game and schools seeded #7 or higher received a bye into the quarterfinal round; adopted in 1983, this format persisted through the 1991 tournament. After the Big East expanded to 10 teams, the 1992 tournament had two first-round games for the #7 through #10 seeds, teams seeded #6 or higher getting a bye into the quarterfinal round. This format continued through the 1995 tournament.

1996–2000
For the 1995–1996 season, the Big East expanded to 13 teams and adopted a divisional structure, with teams divided between the Big East 6 Division and the Big East 7 Division. The expansion resulted in a new tournament format in which the #4 through #13 seeds played in the first round and only the #1 through #3 seeds received byes into the quarterfinals. This format lasted through the 2000 tournament.

During the existence of the Big East 6 and Big East 7 divisions, seeding criteria also changed, with the winners of each division receiving the #1 and #2 seeds regardless of record, the second-place team with the best record receiving the #3 seed, and the rest of the schools receiving the #4 through #13 seeds based on conference record and tiebreakers. After 1998, the Big East scrapped the divisions and returned to a unitary conference structure, and tournament seeding again was based strictly on conference record and tiebreakers in 1999 and 2000.

2001–2008

From 2001 through 2008, Big East membership varied between 13 and 16 schools, but the conference limited tournament participation to 12 schools.

From 2001 through 2003, when the Big East again was divided into two divisions — an East and a West Division, each of seven teams — teams were seeded #1 through #6 by division. The third- through sixth-place finishers in each division (a total of eight teams) received the #3 through #6 seeds in each division and played in the first round, with the #3 East seed playing the #6 West seed, the #4 East seed playing the #5 West seed, the #5 East seed playing the #4 West seed, and the #6 East seed playing the #3 West seed. The first- and second-place finishers in each division (a total of four teams) received the #1 and #2 divisional seeds and a bye into the quarterfinal round. Two teams — the seventh-place finishers in each division, after the application of any necessary tiebreaking criteria — did not qualify for the tournament.

From 2004 to 2008, after the Big East again eliminated its division structure, schools again were seeded based on conference record and tiebreakers. The #5 through #12 seeds played in the first round, and the #1 through #4 seeds received byes into the quartfinal round. The Big East′s membership varied between 13 and 16 schools during these years, but only the teams which finished 12th or higher in the conference after the application as necessary of tiebreaking criteria qualified for the tournament.

2009–2013
In 2009, the conference returned to a tournament format that included all member schools (16 from 2009 to 2012, and 14 in 2013). The teams seeded #9 through #16 played first-round games, teams seeded #5 through #8 received a bye to the second round, and the top four teams received a double-bye to the quarterfinals. The final Big East tournament held by the original Big East Conference, which took place in 2013, saw only 14 teams compete—West Virginia had left the Big East for the Big 12 Conference after the 2011–12 season, and Connecticut was barred from the tournament due to an NCAA postseason ban for academic reasons. In that tournament, the teams seeded #11 through #14 played in the first round, with byes remaining the same as in the 2010–2012 period.

Throughout the 2009–2013 period, all member schools participating in the tournament were seeded in the tournament based on their conference records. Non-conference games were ignored.  Ties were broken using an elaborate set of tiebreaker rules, with the first two tiebreakers being head-to-head record and common record against the next-best conference team.

2014–present
During the offseason in 2013, seven schools left the original Big East Conference of 1979–2013 and joined three other schools in forming a new Big East Conference, the old conference becoming the American Athletic Conference. The new Big East Conference took over control of the Big East tournament. From 2014 — the first tournament held after the formation of the new Big East — through 2019 all 10 member schools took part in the tournament, with tiebreakers similar to those used prior to the formation of the new conference employed as needed. The #7 through #10 seeds played in two first-round games, and all schools seeded #6 or higher received a bye into the quarterfinal round. The 2020 tournament would have followed the same format if it had not been canceled after the first round.

In 2021, after the Big East expanded to 11 teams with Connecticut′s move to the Big East from the American Athletic Conference, the Big East tournament adopted an 11-team format in which the #6 through #11 seeds play in three first-round games and teams seeded #5 or higher receive a bye into the quarterfinal round.

Tournament results

{| class="wikitable sortable" style="text-align:center"
!Year
!Champion
!Score
!Runner-up
!MVP
!Venue
|-
|1980
|Georgetown
|87–81
|Syracuse
| , GU
|Providence Civic Center (Providence, Rhode Island)
|-
|1981
|Syracuse
|83–80
|Villanova
| , SU
|Carrier Dome (Syracuse, New York)
|-
|1982
|Georgetown
|72–54	
|Villanova
| , GU
|Hartford Civic Center (Hartford, Connecticut)
|-
|1983
|St. John's
|85–77
|Boston College
| , St. John's
| rowspan="41" |Madison Square Garden (New York City)
|-
|1984
|Georgetown
|82–71
|Syracuse
| , GU
|-
|1985
|Georgetown
|92–80
|St. John's
| , GU
|-
|1986
|St. John's
|70–69
|Syracuse
| , SU
|-
|1987
|Georgetown
|69–59
|Syracuse
| , GU
|-
|1988
|Syracuse
|85–68
|Villanova
| , SU
|-
|1989
|Georgetown
|88–79
|Syracuse
| , GU
|-
|1990
|Connecticut
|78–75
|Syracuse
| , UConn
|-
|1991
|Seton Hall
|74–62
|Georgetown
| , SH
|-
|1992
|Syracuse
|56–54
|Georgetown
| , GU
|-
|1993
|Seton Hall
|103–70
|Syracuse
| , SH
|-
|1994
|Providence
|74–64
|Georgetown
| , PC
|-
|1995
|Villanova
|94–78
|Connecticut
| , VU
|-
|1996
|Connecticut
|75–74
|Georgetown
| , GU
|-
|1997
|Boston College
|70–58
|Villanova
| , BC
|-
|1998
|Connecticut
|69–64
|Syracuse
| , UConn
|-
|1999
|Connecticut
|82–63
|St. John's
| , UConn
|-
|2000
|St. John's
|80–70
|Connecticut
| , SJU
|-
|2001
|Boston College
|79–57
|Pittsburgh
| , BC
|-
|2002
|Connecticut
|74–65*
|Pittsburgh
| , UConn
|-
|2003
|Pittsburgh
|74–56
|Connecticut
| , Pitt
|-
|2004
| Connecticut
|61–58
|Pittsburgh
| , UConn
|-
|2005
|Syracuse
|68–59
|West Virginia
| , SU
|-
|2006
|Syracuse
|65–61
|Pittsburgh
| , SU
|-
|2007
|Georgetown
|65–42
|Pittsburgh
| , GU
|-
|2008
|Pittsburgh
|74–65
|Georgetown
| , Pitt
|-
|2009
|Louisville
|76–66
|Syracuse
| , SU
|-
|2010
|West Virginia
|60–58
|Georgetown
| , West Virginia
|-
|2011
|Connecticut
|69–66
|Louisville
| , UConn
|-
|2012
|Louisville
|50–44
|Cincinnati
| , Louisville
|-
|2013
|Louisville
|78–61
|Syracuse
| , Louisville
|-
|2014
|Providence
|65–58
|Creighton
|, Providence
|-
|2015
|Villanova
|69–52
|Xavier
|, Villanova
|-
|2016
|Seton Hall
|69–67
|Villanova
|, SH
|-
|2017
|Villanova
|74–60
|Creighton
|, Villanova
|-
|2018
|Villanova
|76–66*
|Providence
|, Villanova
|-
|2019
|Villanova
|74–72
|Seton Hall
|, Villanova
|-
|2020
|colspan=4|Canceled after first round due to the COVID-19 pandemic|-
|2021
|Georgetown
|73–48
|Creighton
| , GU
|-
|2022
|Villanova
|54–48
|Creighton
|, Villanova
|-
|2023
|Marquette
|65–51
|Xavier
|, Marquette 
|
|}
 Louisville was forced to vacate their 2012 & 2013 win due to 2015 sex scandal

Championships by school

 Italics indicate school is no longer a member of the Big East Conference.

Current members Butler and DePaul have yet to make an appearance in the Big East Championship Game. Former members Miami, Notre Dame, Virginia Tech, Rutgers, and South Florida did not appear in the championship during their respective conference tenures.

Performance by team

1980–2005 conference alignment

NOTE: From 2001 through 2003, the teams which finished in last place in the East and West Divisions did not qualify for the tournament. In 2004 and 2005, teams which finished below 12th place in the conference did not qualify for the tournament. 

2006–2013 conference alignment

NOTE: From 2006 through 2008, teams which finished below 12th place in the conference did not qualify for the tournament. In 2013, Connecticut did not qualify for the tournament because of Academic Progress Rate violations

Since 2014 realignmentthrough 2023 tournament''

NOTE: The 2020 tournament was canceled during halftime of the first quarterfinal game due to the COVID-19 pandemic. Georgetown and Xavier lost their first-round games; Creighton and St. John′s did not complete their quarterfinal game, and none of the other teams played their quarterfinal games.

Key

Television coverage

Before the 2013 conference split, the Big East was the only conference to have every tournament game broadcast nationwide on the ESPN family of networks, with every game from the second round forward broadcast on ESPN.  2011 marked the first year the tournament was broadcast in 3D on ESPN 3D.

Beginning with the 2014 tournament, FS1 is the television home for the Big East tournament.

References

 
Recurring sporting events established in 1980